The 1945 Victorian state election was held on 10 November 1945.

The incumbent government at this election was led by Ian Macfarlan, and consisted of Liberal, Country Party and Independent members. Although none of these were endorsed by parties, they maintained affiliations. A Ministerial column, comprising members who explicitly supported the Macfarlan government, is included in the table below, with other party affiliations indicated in brackets.

Seat changes
Boroondara Liberal MLA Trevor Oldham contested Malvern.
Bulla and Dalhousie Country MLA Leslie Webster contested Mernda.
Essendon Labor MLA Samuel Merrifield contested Moonee Ponds.
Flemington Labor MLA Jack Holland contested Footscray.
Goulburn Valley Country MLA John McDonald contested Shepparton.
Heidelberg Independent Liberal MLA Henry Zwar contested Preston.
Kara Kara and Borung Country MLA Finlay Cameron contested Borung.
Korong and Eaglehawk Country MLA Albert Dunstan contested Korong.
Lowan Country MLA Wilfred Mibus contested Borung.
Maryborough and Daylesford Labor MLA Clive Stoneham contested Midlands.
Nunawading Labor MLA Bob Gray contested Box Hill.
Ouyen Country MLA Keith Dodgshun contested Rainbow.
Port Fairy and Glenelg Country MLA Harry Hedditch contested Portland.
Stawell and Ararat Country MLA Alec McDonald contested Ripon.
Upper Goulburn ex-Country Independent MLA Edwin Mackrell contested Goulburn.
Upper Yarra Liberal MLA George Knox contested Scoresby.
Walhalla Country MLA William Moncur contested Gippsland North.
Waranga Country MLA Wollaston Heily contested Rodney.
Warrenheip and Grenville Labor MLA Raymond Hyatt contested Hampden.

Retiring Members
Country MLA Norman Martin (Gunbower) had resigned in September; no by-election had yet been held.

Labor
Ted Cotter MLA (Richmond)
Bill Hodson MLA (Castlemaine and Kyneton)
Jack Mullens MLA (Footscray)

Country
Lot Diffey MLA (Wangaratta and Ovens)

Legislative Assembly
Sitting members are shown in bold text. Successful candidates are highlighted in the relevant colour. Where there is possible confusion, an asterisk (*) is also used.

See also
1946 Victorian Legislative Council election

References

Psephos - Adam Carr's Election Archive

Victoria
Candidates for Victorian state elections